The Oxford History of the United States (1982–present) is an ongoing multi-volume narrative history of the United States published by Oxford University Press.

Volumes

Series overview

Woodward editorship
The series originated in the 1950s with a plan laid out by historians C. Vann Woodward and Richard Hofstadter for a multi-volume history of the United States, one that would provide a summary of the political, social, and cultural history of the nation for a general audience. The project proved to be more challenging than initially envisioned. New fields of historical study emerged in the 1960s, and personal issues intervened for some of the authors. Among the historians connected with the series at one time or another were Willie Lee Rose, Morton Keller, John Lewis Gaddis, Stanley Elkins and Eric McKitrick. Though some of these historians completed books as a result of their respective assignments, none of them was published as part of the series.

The first volume published in the series, Robert Middlekauff's The Glorious Cause: The American Revolution, 1763–1789, finally was released in 1982. Included on the rear dust jacket flap to the original hardcover edition was a projected outline for the series at that point:

 Volume 1: Colonial America by T. H. Breen
 Volume 2: The Glorious Cause by Robert Middlekauff
 Volume 3: Early National America, 1789–1815 by Gordon S. Wood
 Volume 4: Jacksonian America, 1815–1846 by Charles Grier Sellers
 Volume 5: The Civil War by James M. McPherson
 Volume 6: Reconstruction and Industrial America by George M. Fredrickson
 Volume 7: Early 20th Century America, 1900–1930 by William H. Harbaugh
 Volume 8: The New Deal, 1930–1945 by David M. Kennedy
 Volume 9: Postwar America, 1945–1968 by William E. Leuchtenburg
 Volume 10: The American Economy by Stuart Bruchey
 Volume 11: American Diplomacy by Norman A. Graebner

McPherson's volume on the Civil War and its causes was subsequently published in 1988 as Battle Cry of Freedom: The Civil War Era. Two more volumes followed under Woodward's editorship.  Volume 10, Grand Expectations: The United States, 1945–1974 by James T. Patterson, was published in 1997, while  Volume 9, David Kennedy's Freedom From Fear: The American People in Depression and War, 1929–1945, was published in 1999. Sellers's contribution was published separately from the series in 1991 as The Market Revolution: Jacksonian America, 1815–1846, supposedly for its excessive focus on the economics of the era, and the volume reassigned to another historian.

Kennedy editorship

After Woodward's death in 1999, David Kennedy assumed the editorship of the series. Since the start of his tenure, in addition to the revised and expanded edition of Middlekauff's book, four more volumes have appeared: Volume 11, Restless Giant: The United States from Watergate to Bush v. Gore by James T. Patterson, which was published in 2005, Volume 5, Daniel Walker Howe's What Hath God Wrought: The Transformation of America, 1815–1848, which was released in 2007, Volume 12, From Colony to Superpower: U.S. Foreign Relations since 1776 by George C. Herring, published in October 2008, and Empire of Liberty: A History of the Early Republic, 1789–1815 by Gordon S. Wood, published in September 2009. Volume 9 was also published in 2003 as two smaller volumes: The American People in the Great Depression: Freedom from Fear, Part One and The American People in World War II: Freedom from Fear, Part Two. Also in 2003,  The Illustrated Battle Cry of Freedom  was published, a new edition of James M. McPherson's book with the footnotes and a fifth of the original text removed, instead adding numerous maps and photographs with McPherson's commentary.

Herring's 2008 book From Colony to Superpower was republished in 2017 in a two-volume paperback edition: Years of Peril and Ambition: US Foreign Relations, 1776–1921, featuring a new introduction covering this period, and The American Century and Beyond: US Foreign Relations, 1893-2014, also with a new introduction on the period, as well as a new chapter bringing the original book's timeline up to 2014.

A volume written by H. W. Brands covering Gilded Age America — Leviathan: America Comes of Age, 1865–1900 — was also to be published as part of the series, but was withdrawn in 2006 and published outside the Oxford History series in October 2010 as American Colossus: The Triumph of Capitalism, 1865-1900.  Richard White wrote volume 7, The Republic for Which It Stands, which covers Reconstruction and the Gilded Age and was published in September 2017.

Volume 2 was being written by Fred Anderson and Andrew Cayton under the title Imperial America, 1672-1764, however, the volume is currently on hold after the death of Andrew Cayton in 2015.

Reception 
For the most part, the publication of each volume has been greeted with laudatory reviews. Three of the volumes (McPherson's Battle Cry of Freedom, Kennedy's Freedom from Fear, and Howe's What Hath God Wrought) were awarded the Pulitzer Prize for History upon their publication. Middlekauff's Glorious Cause and Wood's Empire of Liberty were finalists for the prize in 1982 and 2010, respectively. Patterson's Grand Expectations also received the 1997 Bancroft Prize in American history, and Kennedy's Freedom from Fear also received the 2000  Francis Parkman Prize.

When originally published in hardcover, McPherson's Battle Cry of Freedom spent 16 weeks on The New York Times Best Seller list, and an additional 3 months for the subsequent paperback edition.

However, in the October 2006 issue of the Atlantic Monthly, the magazine's book editor, Benjamin Schwarz, criticized the volumes by Kennedy and Patterson in the Oxford History of the United States as "bloated and intellectually flabby" compared to the entries in the New Oxford History of England, maintaining that the volumes "lack the intellectual refinement, analytic sharpness, and stylistic verve" of their English counterparts.  However, Schwarz's criticism has been described as "idiosyncratic."

Earlier work 
In 1927, Oxford University Press published a two-volume history of the United States by Samuel Eliot Morison, entitled The Oxford History of the United States, 1783–1917. Morison later invited Henry Steele Commager to join him in preparing a revised and expanded version, under the title The Growth of the American Republic.  This history in two volumes became the leading undergraduate American history textbook; it appeared in seven editions between 1930 and 1980 (1930; 1937; 1942; 1950, 1962; 1969; 7th edition, with William E. Leuchtenburg, 1980).  In 1980, Leuchtenburg prepared a revised and condensed version, A Concise History of the American Republic, which saw a second edition in 1983.

References

External links 
 Oxford University Press
 Powells.com: Book Review — Oxford History of the United States #03: The Glorious Cause: The American Revolution, 1763–1789, The Atlantic Monthly, 1 March 2005

Publications established in the 1950s
1982 non-fiction books
History books about the United States
Series of history books
History of the United States